Saku Parish is a rural municipality in Harju County, north-western Estonia.

The administrative centre of Saku Parish is Saku; a small town with population of 4,618 (as of 2005). It is situated 10 km south of Estonia's capital, Tallinn.

History 
Established in 1866.

Awarded the Japanese Foreign Minister’s Commendation for their contributions to promotion of mutual understanding between Estonia and Japan on December 1, 2020.

Local government 
Current chairman of the council (est: volikogu esimees) is Eero Alamaa.

As of 2018, the mayor (est: vallavanem) is Marti Rehemaa.

Religion

Geography

Populated places 
There are 2 small towns (est: alevikud, sg. alevik) and 19 villages (est: külad, sg. küla) in Saku Parish.

Small towns: Kiisa, Saku.

Villages: Jälgimäe, Juuliku, Kajamaa, Kasemetsa, Kirdalu, Kurtna, Lokuti, Männiku, Metsanurme, Rahula, Roobuka, Saue, Saustinõmme, Sookaera-Metsanurga, Tänassilma, Tagadi, Tammejärve, Tammemäe, Tõdva, Üksnurme.

Sport 
Kurtna is home to Bandy Federation of Estonia:

References

External links 
 
 Maps of Saku Parish

 
Municipalities of Estonia